About 50 Km from Rampur Bushahar.Shraikoti Temple is situated on top of it . It is a gram Panchayat(GP) and the people of the village are very hardworking.Apple is main cash crop here.The village is well connected to roads.There is a old temple of MAA Durga situated in the middle of village.Wild life Dharanghati is situated near the village where you can see black bears,snow leopard,monal and some other species.Kuhal is a village in the north eastern region of Rampur Bushahr, Shimla district, Himachal Pradesh, India.

Villages in Shimla district